is a constituency of the House of Representatives in the Diet of Japan (national legislature). It is located in Hiroshima and consists of the city of Fukuyama. As of 2012, 377,672 eligible voters were registered in the district.

Before the electoral reform of 1994, the area had been part of Hiroshima 3rd district where five Representatives had been elected by single non-transferable vote.

The first representative for the single-member 7th district was former Prime Minister Kiichi Miyazawa for the Liberal Democratic Party. In 2000, he was followed by Yōichi Miyazawa (LDP), son of former Hiroshima governor Hiroshi Miyazawa, nephew of Kiichi Miyazawa, grandson of Representatives Yutaka Miyazawa and Masaki Kishida and great-grandson of Representative Heikichi Ogawa. In the landslide election of 2009 when the LDP-Kōmeitō coalition lost its majority, Takashi Wada, husband of former Finance minister Tatsuo Murayama's granddaughter, won the district against Miyazawa for the Democratic Party. In the landslide election of 2012 when the DPJ-PNP coalition lost more than two-thirds of its seats, Liberal Democrat Fumiaki Kobayashi won the district.

List of representatives

Election results 

 
 
 
 
  

 
 
 
 
  

 
   |votes      = 133,871
   |percentage = 
   |change     =
 }}

References 

Districts of the House of Representatives (Japan)